"Señorita" is a song by American singer-songwriter Justin Timberlake for his debut studio album, Justified (2002). It was released on July 7, 2003, by Jive Records as the fourth single from the album. He co-wrote the track with its producers Pharrell Williams and Chad Hugo of The Neptunes. According to Timberlake, the song was influenced by Stevie Wonder. Musically, "Señorita" is an R&B, pop, and jazz up-tempo ballad, featuring an electric piano strut, cowbell in beat of the song, and a rhythm section. The song has been described as a Spanish "number" with a "Latin flavored" cut beat. In the track, Timberlake sings about a woman, whose attention he is trying to capture. "Señorita" received positive reviews from music critics, who commented on the track's general sound and lyrics.

Commercially, the song peaked within the top ten in Australia and New Zealand, the top twenty in Belgium, Denmark, Ireland, and the United Kingdom, and the top thirty in the Netherlands, Sweden, and the United States. Its music video was nominated for an MTV Video Music Award in the category for Best Male Video in 2004.

Background and recording
"Señorita" was co-written by Justin Timberlake, and The Neptunes' Pharrell Williams and Chad Hugo. Before the release of Timberlake's solo album, Justified, Timberlake and the album's producers, Williams and Hugo, gave MTV News a preview of the record in August 2002. While in discussion of "Señorita", Hugo said that he expected the song to make the track listing of Justified. In another interview, Timberlake revealed that the song was influenced by singer-songwriter Stevie Wonder. Timberlake said that the song had "that groove that really fits into the summer". While in development, Timberlake said he was "beatboxing the notes". He wrote the song imagining a "dark-skinned, voluptuous lady whose attention he is trying to capture."

Composition
"Señorita" is a "Spanish number" infused with an R&B, up-tempo ballad. The song has been described as a fast "hot mid-tempo" and dance song. The song is composed in the key of E minor and is set in time signature of common time with a tempo of 96 beats per minute. The music begins with an electric piano strut, that provides the main chordal accompaniment. A cowbell chimes, in beat of the song, in the background. Timberlake sings in a "reasonable falsetto vamping". The song's musicscape also features hand claps, a rhythm section, and "cruises on an unconventional reedy rhythm and crackling beat", according to Chuck Cavalaris of The Knoxville News-Sentinel. The track is also considered a "blues inflected track", and a dance jam. Kevin O'Hare of the Sunday Republican said the song is "a Latin-flavored cut with a pronounced beat". Lisa Rose of The Star-Ledger commented that the song has a "jazz-funk ... embellished with a ground-rumbling beat and horn section solos." Fort Worth Star-Telegram said that the song has a "minimalist funk strut", while a contributor of the New Straits Times said that the single is "a funk song with an organic feel – and quite close to Stevie Wonder's soulful style."

According to Teresa Gubbins of The Dallas Morning News, she described the theme of the song as Timberlake singing about a girl with brown eyes. O'Hare noted that there are "some very amusing" improvisations as Timberlake guides the "guys and the ladies though their background vocal segment." Stephen Thomas Erlewine of Allmusic also reported that Timberlake exhorts "the fellas and ladies" in "Señorita" to sing separately "in a cringe-worthy affectation". He directs the men to sing, "It feels like something's heatin' up. Can I leave with you?" and the women to sing, "I don't know what I'm thinking bout / really leavin wit you."

Critical reception
Music critic David Browne of Entertainment Weekly, in review of the album, wrote: "In the latter category, he's more engaging—the stud on the loose, making promises of romance and more in slurpy cuts like 'Senorita' and 'Rock Your Body'." Denise Boyd of the BBC wrote: "The introduction [of] 'Senorita' immediately grabs your attention." Tyler Martin of Stylus said that the song's rhythm section was "brilliant, a simple, yet distinctive beat that could only come from the Neptunes. The song allows for much amusement in the last minute and a half with a sing-along that is more wonderful and surprising than most artists have offered us this year." Jonathan Takiff of the Philadelphia Daily News wrote that the track and "Nothing Else", another song from the album, reshape "Stevie Wonder-style Latin pop". Katie McDonald of Boston College wrote: "The album opens with the Latin and hip-hop influenced 'Senorita'. Although this reviewer was a little amused by Timberlake's use of the word 'Momma' in reference to a girl, this track is nothing to mock. Timberlake's voice complements the dynamic beat; and although the lyrics are in no way profound, at least he wrote them himself." Lisa Verrico of The Times wrote that the song could be 'NSYNC "with a salsa flavour". Christian Dahlager of Iowa State Daily noted that Timberlake "cops classic Michael Jackson" throughout the album, and on the tracks "Señorita" and "Rock Your Body". Howard Cohen of Knight Ridder said that in the album Timberlake "appropriates Jackson's trademark 'Thriller'-era falsetto squeals and staccato vocal style on the tuneless first single 'Like I Love You', 'Senorita' and a couple other cuts."

The song received criticism as well. Jane Stevenson of Jam! wrote: "In the minus category is silly lead-off track 'Senorita', which suffers from being too cute and has an awful call-and-answer ending featuring 'the guys and the ladies.'" A music contributor from the Daily Free Press reported that The Neptunes appeared to have "recycled beats from their N.E.R.D. project" for Justified and that "Señorita" sounded like N.E.R.D.'s song, "Run to the Sun".

Chart performance
In North America, the single was officially solicited to radio in September 2003. "Señorita" appeared on the Billboard Hot 100 and peaked at number 27. It reached number 5 on the Mainstream Top 40, number 10 on the Top 40 Tracks and number 29 on the Rhythmic.

The single performed averagely when it was released internationally. It debuted at number 13 in the United Kingdom for the week ending September 27, 2003. The song failed to achieve any higher position, and it fell for eight consecutive weeks until it left the charts completely. When it entered the Irish Singles Chart, it did so at number 15. It spent seven weeks on the chart but failed to earn a higher position. In New Zealand, it charted at number 9 on September 14, 2003. During the following four weeks, it peaked at number 4 and remained there for two weeks. The song spent 15 weeks on the chart. In Australia, it peaked at number 6 and retired after spending eleven weeks on the chart. The single additionally charted in mainland European countries, peaking within the top 20 in several.

Music video
The music video for "Señorita" was directed by Paul Hunter. The video was filmed in July 2003 and shot in a club in Los Angeles. The video also features cameo appearances by both Pharrell Williams and Chad Hugo. In mid-2003, Timberlake was asked about the concept of the video, but said that the video was still in development. He was asked whether he would be aiming his affection at a "lovely lady", to which Timberlake responded, "No. Why would you limit yourself to just one?" In the "Señorita" video, Timberlake performed with his live band.

The video begins, with the song playing, at an outside scenery of a bar. Inside, Timberlake is seen and goes directly to the bar. He looks at the stage area and immediately goes there. He takes the microphone and begins singing the song. Pharrell is shown playing the drums while Chad is at the keyboards throughout the video. Timberlake continues singing, but grabs the attention of a woman in a red dress (Natalie Martinez). Elsewhere, Timberlake, not on stage, is shown dancing with a woman wearing a white blouse, while he sings the song. In another part of the video, Timberlake dances with a different woman. In the bridge, he sings to the two women and dances with them, in separate shots. Following the bridge he is then seen performing on stage. In part of the song, Timberlake directs the crowd of men and women, telling the men to sing, "It feels like something's heatin' up. Can I leave with you?" and the women to sing, "I don't know what I'm thinking bout / really leavin wit you." Timberlake ends the song with "Gentlemen, good night / Ladies, good morning".

Actor Owen Wilson and his then-girlfriend, Carolina Cerisola, appear in the video. Lanford Beard of Middlebury College Student Weekly, in review of the video, wrote that Timberlake's "Mexicali saloon setting" for the video "embraced a certain macho, trashy playa aesthetic" for him "so we'll take it on the chin that this is the image he's building for himself and – love it or hate it – we might as well get used to it." In 2004, the video was nominated for an MTV Video Music Award in the category of Best Male Video.

Live performances

Timberlake performed the song live on the sketch comedy show Saturday Night Live in October 2003, where he served as host and musical guest. At the 46th Grammy Awards in 2004, he also performed the song live and was accompanied by Latin jazz trumpeter Arturo Sandoval. On August 25, 2013, he performed "Señorita" in a medley with other of his songs at the 2013 MTV Video Music Awards.

"Señorita" was featured on Justin Timberlake: Live from London (2002), Justified and Stripped Tour (2003), FutureSex/LoveShow (2007), Legends of the Summer (2013) and The 20/20 Experience World Tour (2013/14).

Track listings

Canadian CD single
 "Señorita" (album version) – 4:54
 "Señorita" (radio edit) – 4:29

Australian CD single
 "Señorita" (album version) – 4:54
 "Señorita" (instrumental) – 4:54
 "Señorita" (Eddie's extended club mix) – 6:27
 "Rock Your Body" (Vasquez club anthem) – 9:15
 "Señorita" (video)

UK CD and cassette single
 "Señorita" (radio edit short intro) – 4:16
 "Señorita" (Eddie's crossover rhythm mix) – 4:18
 "Señorita" (Eddie's extended dance mix) – 6:27
 "Señorita" (Dr. Octavo 2-step mix) – 3:50

UK 12-inch single
A1. "Señorita" (Num club mix) – 7:43
B1. "Señorita" (Thick vocal mix) – 7:27
B2. "Señorita" (Eddie's crossover rhythm mix) – 4:18

European CD single
 "Señorita" (radio edit short intro) – 4:16
 "Señorita" (instrumental) – 4:54

European maxi-CD single
 "Señorita" (album version) – 4:54
 "Señorita" (instrumental) – 4:54
 "Señorita" (Eddie's extended club mix) – 6:27
 "Señorita" (video)

Charts

Weekly charts

Year-end charts

Certifications

Release history

References

2000s ballads
2002 songs
2003 singles
Jive Records singles
Justin Timberlake songs
Music videos directed by Paul Hunter (director)
Song recordings produced by the Neptunes
Songs written by Chad Hugo
Songs written by Justin Timberlake
Songs written by Pharrell Williams
Songs about casual sex